40 Sticks is a 2020 Kenyan thriller film produced by SensePLAY, a Kenyan audio-visual production house, an arm of Password Ventures Ltd.  It premiered on Netflix on November 20, 2020, showing in Africa, US, UK, Canada, New Zealand and Australia. 40 Sticks is the fourth Kenyan film to premiere on Netflix in 2020, after Poacher, Sincerely Daisy and Disconnect. The story was created by Frank G. Maina, and written together with Voline Ogutu, and directed by Victor Gatonye.

40 Sticks was executive produced by Anthony Macharia, Lucas Bikedo, Betty M. Mutua and Fakii Liwali.

Plot 
40 Sticks revolves around the story of a group of death row prisoners trapped in a prison bus that crashes, and their struggle to survive. Their misery is worsened by a wild animals in the forest and a mysterious killer that lurks in the shadows.

Cast 
 Robert Agengo.
 Mwaura Bilal.
 Cajetan Boy.
 Andreo Kamau.
 Arabron Nyyneque
 Shiviske Shiviski.
 Xavier Ywaya.

Production 
The film is produced by SensePlay in partnership with Film Studios Kenya, Bingi Media and Ogopa Inc. It was shot in Nairobi across 5 locations over a 16-day shoot period in February 2019.

References

External links
 

2020 films
Kenyan thriller films
2020 thriller films